Pontiac Airpark, formerly , was located  east of Pontiac, Quebec, Canada on the Ottawa River.  It was closed permanently in 2015.

See also
Pontiac Airpark Water Aerodrome

References

Defunct airports in Quebec